{{DISPLAYTITLE:Phi1 Cancri}}

Phi1 Cancri, Latinised from φ1 Cancri, is a solitary, orange-hued star in the constellation Cancer. It is faintly visible to the naked eye with an apparent visual magnitude of +5.57. Based upon an annual parallax shift of 8.74 mas, it is approximately 370 light-years from the Sun.

This is an evolved K-type giant star with a stellar classification of K5 III. At the estimated distance of Phi1 Cancri, this yields a physical size of about 17 times the radius of the Sun.

References

K-type giants
Cancri, Phi1
Cancer (constellation)
Durchmusterung objects
Cancri, 22
071093
041377
3304